The white-crowned shama (Copsychus stricklandii) is a bird in the Old World flycatcher family. It is endemic to the Southeast Asian island of Borneo.

Taxonomy
It is closely related to the white-rumped shama (Copsychus malabaricus), and is sometimes considered a subspecies of that species. In turn, the white-crowned shama has two subspecies:
C. s. stricklandii Motley & Dillwyn, 1855 – north and north-eastern Borneo, including Banggi Island
C. s. barbouri (Bangs & Peters, 1927) (Maratua Shama) – Maratua Islands

The specific name was bestowed in honour of Hugh Edwin Strickland

Description
Mainly blue-black upperparts contrast with orange-rufous underparts. It has a white rump and black throat. It is largely similar in appearance to the white-rumped shama subspecies C. m. suavis, which replaces it in southern and western Borneo, and hybridises with it where the ranges meet. It differs in having a white, rather than black, crown. The distinctive Maratua form C. s. barbouri is about 20% longer than the nominate, and has an all-black tail, rather than white outer rectrices.

Aviculture
White-crowned shamas are bred by local aviculturists in Borneo as cage-birds valued for their singing ability. They continue to be trapped as it is believed that wild-caught young birds are stronger, and better songsters, than those bred in captivity.

References

Copsychus
Endemic birds of Borneo
Birds described in 1855
Borneo lowland rain forests